Dimitrios (Greek Δημήτριος) is a Greek shipwreck famous due to its picturesque location on an easily accessible sandy beach near Gythio, Greece.

Dimitrios (previously named Klintholm), a small,  cargo ship of 965 gross register tons cargo capacity built in Denmark in 1950, was registered in the Prefecture of Piraeus, registration no. 2707. The ship belonged 76.75% to the Molaris Brothers (Greek: Αφοί Μόλαρη) and 23.25% to the Matsinos Brothers (Greek Αφοί Ματσινού). Dimitrios has been stranded on the beach at Valtaki (Greek Βαλτάκι) in today's Evrotas municipality in the prefecture of Laconia, Greece, since 23 December 1981.

There are many rumors about the ship's origins and how it got stranded on the beach. Most relate that the ship was used to smuggle cigarettes between Turkey and Italy. She was then set on fire to hide the evidence of cigarette smuggling. Another, less common rumor speaks of a ghost ship of unknown origins.

However, according to a book written by the Honorary Chief of the Hellenic Coast Guard, Vice Admiral Christos Ntounis (1935–2010), Ta Navagia stis Ellinikes thalasses (translated as The shipwrecks of the Greek seas) there is more to be said about the true history of the ship.

History of the shipwreck 

In Ta Navagia stis Ellinikes thalasses (Volume B 1950–2000), Ntounis writes that the ship made an emergency docking at Gythio on 4 December 1980 because her captain needed access to a hospital due to a serious illness. However, after the ship's docking, financial problems arose with the crew, as did various engine problems, coupled with insurance measures imposed by various lenders. The crew was then fired and the task of safeguarding the ship was assigned to Georgios Daniil and Vasilis Parigoris.

The ship was docked at Gythio until June 1981, when she was declared unsafe due to wear on the docking ropes and starboard list due to water entering her hull. The port authorities asked for her to be moved to an anchorage outside the port for safety reasons, but the owners did not respond until November 1981. The book states that "at approximately 12:30 p.m. on the 9th of November 1981 the ship was swept about 2 [nautical?] miles [2.3 miles; 3.7 km] away due to severe weather conditions and it was temporary anchored". But the temporary anchorage did not last for long, as the ship was swept away again and finally stranded at its current location on the beach at Valtaki on 23 December 1981. The ship was then simply abandoned there and no attempts were made to recover her.

References
 
Αντιναυάρχου ΝΤΟΥΝΗ "ΤΑ ΝΑΥΑΓΙΑ ΣΤΙΣ ΕΛΛΗΝΙΚΕΣ ΘΑΛΑΣΣΕΣ"  1951–2000 ΤΟΜΟΣ B έκδοση 2001  FINATEC  Α.Ε
(Vice Admiral Ntounis "The shipwrecks on the Greek Seas" 1951 - 2000 Volume B published 2001)

Shipwrecks of Greece
Maritime incidents in 1981
Laconia